Patricia Millardet (24 March 1957 − 13 April 2020) was a French movie and television actress, who played judge Silvia Conti in the Italian mafia series La piovra.

She died of a heart attack in 2020 at the age of 63.

Partial filmography

 (Rat Race, 1980)
Fifty-Fifty (1981) as Patricia Mercadier
 (1982) as Anne-Marie
Plus beau que moi, tu meurs (1982) as Mylène
La Boum 2 (1982)
Mortelle randonnée (Deadly Circuit, 1983)
Sandy (1983) as Catherine
 (1984) as Joséphine
P'tit Con (1984) as Aurore
L'Île de la jeune fille bleue (1984, TV Movie) as Anne Coulange
Blessure (1985) as Julie
L'Heure Simenon: Strip-tease (1987, TV Series) as Célita
Les Passions de Céline (1987, TV Series) as Béatrice
Série noire (1986, Episode: "La Nuit du flingueur") as Nina
Le Chevalier de Pardaillan (1988, TV Series) as Fausta
Série noire (1988, Episode: "Cause à l'autre") as Eléna
La piovra,  (1989, TV Mini-Series) as Silvia Conti
Coplan: Le vampire des Caraïbes (1989, TV Series) as Jenny
The Sun Also Shines at Night (1990) as Aurelia
La piovra,  (1990, TV Mini-Series) as Silvia Conti
Errore fatale (Condition Critical, 1991, TV Movie) as Giulia Visconti
Hélène et les Garçons (1992, TV Series)
Jo et Milou (1992, TV Movie) as Jo
Hot Chocolate (1992, TV Movie) as Lucrétia
La piovra,  (1992, TV Mini-Series) as Silvia Conti
Nero come il cuore (Black as the Heart, 1994, TV Movie) as Giovanna Alga Croce
La piovra,  (1994, TV Mini-Series) as Silvia Conti
Wild Justice (1994, TV Movie) as Magda Altmann
Visioner (Babyraub – Kinder fremder Mächte, 1998, TV Movie) as Jeanne
Un bacio nel buio (A Kiss in the Dark, 1999, TV Movie) as Alessandra Del Giudice
La piovra,  (1999, TV Mini-Series) as Silvia Conti
Il bello delle donne (2002–2003, TV Series) as Avv. Angelina Brusa

References

External links
 

1957 births
2020 deaths
French film actresses
French television actresses
People from Mont-de-Marsan